Katrin Loo (born 2 January 1991) is a retired Estonian footballer who played as a forward for Naiste Meistriliiga club FC Flora and the Estonia women's national team.

Career
Loo made her debut for the Estonian national team as soon as May 2007, in a friendly match against Latvia. In club competitions, she started her career playing for Flora Tallinn in Estonia's Meistriliiga before transferring in 2011 to Dayton Flyers in the NCAA. She subsequently moved to Finland's Naisten Liiga, playing first for NiceFutis and later for Merilappi United.

Titles
 2 Estonian Cups (2007, 2008)

References

External links

1991 births
Living people
Estonian women's footballers
Estonia women's international footballers
Expatriate women's soccer players in the United States
Estonian expatriate footballers
Estonian expatriate sportspeople in the United States
Estonian expatriate sportspeople in Finland
Expatriate women's footballers in Finland
Kansallinen Liiga players
NiceFutis players
Dayton Flyers women's soccer players
Footballers from Tallinn
Women's association football forwards
FIFA Century Club
FC Flora (women) players